Dev Kumari Thapa (14 April 1928–5 May 2011 AD) was an Indian Nepali-language writer, who mainly wrote stories.

Biography

Early life 
She was born on 14 April 1928 (2 Baisakh 1985 BS) in Kurseong, Darjeeling, India to father Hasta Bahadur Katuwal and mother Ramadevi Katuwal. She was orphaned at a young age. Her father passed away before she was born. When she was about ten, her mother died and was raised by her grandmother.

Education 
She completed high school in Darjeeling and then went on to earn a diploma from a 3-year nursing course.

Notable works

References

1928 births
2011 deaths
People from Darjeeling district
Indian Gorkhas
Nepali-language writers from India
Nepali-language writers
20th-century Indian writers
20th-century Indian women writers
21st-century Indian writers
21st-century Indian women writers
20th-century Nepalese writers
20th-century Nepalese women writers
21st-century Nepalese writers
21st-century Nepalese women writers
Indian women short story writers
Nepalese women short story writers
[[Category:Nepalese women short story
writers]]